Ahmad Zohadi is an Iranian architecture scholar, publisher and researcher. Currently, he is the CEO and editor-in-chief of architectural magazine 2A Magazine.

He is also the founder and chief editor of ‘Architecture & Construction’, a Persian quarterly magazine, published since 2003, and distributed in Iran.

Early life

Education
Ahmad was born in Tehran. On completion of his primary and secondary education, he attended Karaj Islamic Azad University in the year 1992 for Civil & Structure Engineering. Simultaneously, he was editor and publisher of Tehran-based Architecture and Construction Magazine & 2A Magazine.

Personal
Ahmad has been known to show keen interest in photography right from his childhood. He got involved in architecture and construction after associating himself with architectural journalism. He got married in the year 2013 to Negin Farrokh. Together, they have a son named Radan.

Appreciations and recognitions
Arab Engineering Schooling Bureau & Harvard Design School 
United Nations Educational Scientific and Cultural Organization, UNESCO Chair in Islamic Architectural University of Tehran
ECO Cultural Institute Headquarters, Tehran
The Kamla Raheja Vidyanidhi, Institute For Architecture And Environmental Studies
The Catholic University of America, School of Architecture and planning
College of Architecture + Planning, The University of Utah 
Centre of Middle Eastern Studies, Harvard University
North Carolina State University a land-grant university and a constituent institution of the University of North Carolina
Al Ahmadiah - Contracting & Trading
Nakheel, Retail Shopping Malls
Canadian University of Dubai
Centre for Middle Eastern Studies, Harvard University

2A Magazine

He is the current CEO and editor-in-chief of 2A magazine. It is an architectural magazine dedicated to different provincial architectures of the world, being distributed all through Middle East Asia.

2A Continental Architectural Awards
Ahmad Zohadi is the founder, organizer and director of 2A Continental Architectural Awards organized since 2015 – award organized under the banner of the 2A magazine. The first award was the 2A Asia Architecture Award 2015 held on July 15, 2015 at Istanbul Technical University, Istanbul.

Film career and interviews
He has produced a documentary in 2012, on Indo-Iranian culture, history and architecture, which he wrote, produced and directed. He has also interviewed a number of famous personalities like Foster and Partners, Balkrishna Vithaldas Doshi, Sergei Tchoban, Seung H-Sang, Bahram Shirdel, Richard S. Levine and John Alexander Smith.

References

External links

People from Tehran
Iranian editors
Iranian architects
Iranian journalists
Living people
1969 births